Michael Alan Bonner (born November 5, 1990) is a former American football wide receiver. He was drafted by the Houston Texans in the sixth round of the 2013 NFL Draft. He played college football at Jacksonville State University.

High school
Bonner was the team captain of the Newnan High School football team, playing under coach Robert Herring. An All-District, All-Region and All-State performer, he ended his high school career with 93 catches for 1,932 career yards.

College career
Alan attended Jacksonville State University, joining the Gamecocks as a freshman in 2009. In 2010 Bonner served as the Gamecocks' main returner as well as a backup receiver, making 17 catches and 5 touchdowns. In 2011 Bonner's focus shifted to receiving, with 33 catches and 3 touchdowns; he started 10 out of 11 games in this year.

Professional career

He was drafted by the Houston Texans in the sixth round, 195th overall in the 2013 NFL Draft. Bonner has yet to play a down in the NFL, as he has spent the entire 2013 and 2014 seasons on injured reserve.

References

1990 births
Living people
People from Newnan, Georgia
Sportspeople from the Atlanta metropolitan area
Players of American football from Georgia (U.S. state)
American football wide receivers
Jacksonville State Gamecocks football players
Houston Texans players